Ausana was an ancient Roman-Berber city and bishopric in Tunisia. It is now a Latin Catholic titular see.

History 
Ausana was important enough in the Late Roman province of Africa Proconsularis to become one of the suffragans of its capital Carthage's Metropolitan Archbishopric, but like most was the fade.

Titular see 
The diocese was nominally restored in 1989 as Latin Catholic titular bishopric.

So far its only incumbent, of the fitting episcopal (lowest) rank, is:
 Titular Bishop (1990.05.26 – ...) Józef Zawitkowski, Auxiliary Bishop emeritus of Łowicz (Poland).

See also 
Catholic Church in Tunisia

References

External links 
 GCatholic 

Catholic titular sees in Africa
Former Roman Catholic dioceses in Africa